Kodaikanal Golf Club is a private membership club with an 18-hole, par 71 Golf course.

The club is on Golf links Road near the popular view point 'Suicide Point'  (Green Valley View) and  before the 'Pillar Rocks' viewpoint and flower garden.
 
This club is notable for its age and the wildlife frequently seen on the course. The club logo is two crossed golf clubs behind an indian tiger on a round yellow field, framed with "Kodaikanal Golf Club * Play the Game" imprinted in white on a dark green border.

History
The club was established on 17 June 1895 by twelve British golfers. They were also the architects of the course. In the early years, members were British and American civil servants  and missionaries. During the fifties it became a club tradition for the annual Captaincy to rotate between an Indian, an American and a Commonwealth citizen. This tradition continued until the late 70's, when the local expatriate population diminished. Originally there were only 9 holes and the putting surfaces were browns. In the early fifties the course was extended to 18 holes. In 1986 the putting surfaces were relaid with greens.
The clubhouse, named the Centenary Building, was renovated in 1995.

Facilities

The Kodaikanal Golf club is a private membership club with over 600 members.
The club has a range of facilities available for the recreation, entertainment and comfort of its guests. The main facility is the 18 hole golf course described below. There is a practice net for driving practice and a designated putting practice area.

Inside the clubhouse, for group activities there is a 12-seat conference room, a card games room, a billiards Room, a members lounge with fireplace, a BYOB bar and a dining hall. For members visiting from a distance, there is lodging available, including 2 super deluxe rooms, 2 deluxe rooms and 2 standard rooms.

Golf Course
Non-members are allowed to play the full 18 holes by becoming temporary members or by paying the required green fees. Non-members must have a handicap or take lessons before they play here. The course is closed 15 April to 15 June.

Total length of the course is  Some holes have interesting alternative names, depending on the challenges they offer to golfers. The 4th hole is also called the Devil's Dip, as the fairway from the tee-box to the green is a solid dip, which runs on as far as the eye can see. The 6th hole is named Tiger Hole because Tigers used to be sighted near it. The 12th hole is called the Cardiac Hole, due to the strenuousness of the walk. A "hard hitters" course, the 13th Twister green is not visible from the tee box.

It takes about 3 hours to play the entire course.

Tournaments
In 2008  fifty-six tournaments were conducted daily between mid-April and early  June. Palani Hill Open, Veday Cup, Rudrappan Memorial Cup, Contessa Open and A V Thomas Tournament (introduced recently), are some of the major tournaments. The 2008 Addicts Golfing Society of Southern India 3 day Kodaikanal meet had 108 entries and 5 competitions. The first regional round of the 'TAKE Solutions World Corporate Golf Challenge' was played in Kodaikanal on 29 December 2010.

Notes

External links
 Kodaikanal Golf Club,  Video, 3:45

Golf clubs and courses in Tamil Nadu
Kodaikanal
Sports venues completed in 1895
Buildings and structures in Tamil Nadu
Sport in Tamil Nadu
1895 establishments in India